Maud Island is one of the larger islands in the Marlborough Sounds on the northeastern tip of the South Island of New Zealand, with a total area of .

Geography
Maud Island is situated approximately halfway along the convoluted Pelorus Sound / Te Hoiere, between two long peninsulas of the South Island. It is separated from the mainland in the west by Apuau Channel and in the north and east by Waitātā Reach. To its south lies Tawhitinui Reach.

The island comprises two main parts: the bulk of the island lies to the west and is oriented roughly northeast to southwest; a smaller spur, connected by a narrow 1-kilometre long isthmus, lies to the east. The island's southernmost point, Harter Point, is on this spur.

A walking track, the Gun Emplacement Track, circles the western part of the island.

History
The first human settlement on the island was by Māori, who cultivated extensive gardens and built food storage pits and gave the island the name Te Pākeka. Ownership of the island was granted to European settler John Gibson in 1867.

Military installations were built on the island during World War II.  Remains of the old gun emplacements and range finding equipment can be seen from the track, close to the island's northernmost point. A jetty was installed on the island at the same time, to enable the equipment to be maintained. In 1971, then-owner Jack Shand gifted some of the island to the Crown; the rest of the island became Royal Forest and Bird Protection property soon afterwards.

Fauna
Maud Island is an important predator free nature reserve (officially a Scientific Reserve as defined under New Zealand's Reserves Act) to which only scientists and conservationists have access. Visitors need a special permit issued by the New Zealand Department of Conservation.

Thanks to the efforts of conservationist Don Merton, kākāpō was introduced onto the predator-free island in 1974. Additional kakapō were subsequently translocated onto other Islands like Codfish Island, Anchor Island and Little Barrier Island.

After only one breeding attempt by pair Flossie and Richard Henry in 1998 where three chicks were born, Maud Island's kākāpō population was translocated to more forested islands. The takahe was also introduced there in 1985.

Another rare species is the Maud Island frog (Leiopelma pakeka), which was split from the Hamilton's frog (Leiopelma hamiltoni) in 1998 and is now seen as its own species. Maud Island has a rich invertebrate fauna. Weta are numerous with tree weta, cave weta and Cook Strait giant weta likely to be seen at night. A large weevil, the flax weevil can be seen on flax and the rare Cook Strait click beetle is also present on the island.

Name
The island's two names, Maud Island and Te Hoiere, were both given official status in 1948. Te Hoiere is also used as the Māori name for Pelorus Sound. The island's former name of Te Pākeka is still used for the Te Pākeka/Maud Island Scientific Reserve.

See also

 List of islands of New Zealand
 List of islands
 Desert island

References

External links

Information about Maud Island (engl.)

Uninhabited islands of New Zealand
Islands of the Marlborough Sounds